Matthew Scott Harte  is an Anglican priest: he was Archdeacon of Raphoe  in the Province of Armagh in the Church of Irelandfrom 1983 until 2013.

Harte was born in 1946, educated at Trinity College, Dublin and ordained in 1971. He was curate at Bangor Abbey then Ballynafeigh before becoming the incumbent at Ardara in 1976. In 1998 he was inducted at Holy Trinity, Dunfanaghy; and retired in 2013. He was  Prebendary of Howth at St Patrick's Cathedral, Dublin from 2007 to 2013.

References

1946 births
Living people
Archdeacons of Raphoe
Alumni of Trinity College Dublin